Col de Tende (elevation 1870 m) is a high mountain pass in the Alps, close to the border between France and Italy, although the highest section of the pass is wholly within France.

It separates the Maritime Alps from the Ligurian Alps. It connects Nice and Tende in Alpes-Maritimes with Cuneo in Piedmont.

A railway tunnel inaugurated in 1898 and a Road Tunnel inaugurated in 1882 run under the pass. The latter tunnel is 3.2 kilometre long and is among the oldest long road tunnels.

French historian François Guizot states that the road was first developed by Phoenicians and later maintained by Greeks and Romans.

See also
 List of highest paved roads in Europe
 List of mountain passes
 France–Italy border
 Main chain of the Alps

References

External links 
Profile on climbbybike.com
Alan Heath - Col de Tende

Mountain passes of the Ligurian Alps
Mountain passes of the Alps
Landforms of Alpes-Maritimes
Mountain passes of Provence-Alpes-Côte d'Azur
Mountain passes of Piedmont
Province of Cuneo
France–Italy border crossings
Transport in Provence-Alpes-Côte d'Azur